Croatians may refer to:

 Croatians, inhabitants of Croatia, citizens of Croatia
 Ethnic Croatians, variant term for ethnic Croats

See also
 Croatia (disambiguation)
 Croatian (disambiguation)
 Names of the Croats and Croatia